Jack Ahoy is a 1934 British comedy film directed by Walter Forde and starring Jack Hulbert, Nancy O'Neil, Alfred Drayton and Sam Wilkinson. Its plot follows a humble seaman falls in love with an Admiral's daughter, whilst trying to battle Chinese pirates. The film was loosely remade in 1954 as Up to His Neck.

Plot
After failing to pass his entrance exam to Dartmouth Naval College, Jack Ponsonby (Jack Hulbert) enlists as an able seaman. On falling in love with the admiral's daughter Patricia (Nancy O'Neil), Jack stumbles into an adventure involving a den of Chinese river pirates who have stolen a British submarine. Anxious to prove himself a hero in Patricia's eyes, he manages to rescue both the admiral and his daughter, when they are kidnapped by the bandits.

Cast

Critical reception
The New York Times called it "An engaging bit of nonsense, acted to the point of sheer physical exhaustion by Mr. Hulbert and his companions, the picture can be recommended as a refreshing escape from the more serious things of life and the cinema"; and more recently, the Radio Times gave the film three out of five stars, and wrote, "Hulbert sings The Hat's on the Side of My Head and gets kidnapped by Chinese revolutionaries! There's a nice pace and an easy-going air of geniality brought to this maritime caper by skilled director Walter Forde, and its sheer breeziness is infectious."

References

External links

1935 films
1935 comedy films
British comedy films
Films directed by Walter Forde
British black-and-white films
1930s English-language films
1930s British films
English-language comedy films